Haji Parvez Ahmad is a Samajwadi Party politician who has served as a Member of the Legislative Assembly in the state of Uttar Pradesh, India. He was elected by a margin of 414 votes to the Legislative Assembly of Uttar Pradesh in 2012 from Allahabad South constituency, when his closest rival was Nand Gopal Gupta of the Bahujan Samaj Party (BSP). He lost the same seat to Gupta, who had moved from the BSP to the Bharatiya Janata Party, in the 2017 elections. The winning margin on that occasion was 28,587 votes.

References 

Samajwadi Party politicians from Uttar Pradesh
Uttar Pradesh MLAs 2012–2017
Living people
1963 births